Drepanomeniidae is a family of solenogaster, a kind of shell-less, worm-like, marine mollusk.

Genera
 Abyssoherpia Gil-Mansilla, García-Álvarez & Urgorri, 2011
 Drepanomenia Heath, 1911

References

 Salvini-Plawen L v. (1978). Antarktische und subantarktische Solenogastres (eine Monographie: 1898-1974). Zoologica (Stuttgart) 128: 1-305
 Costello, M.J.; Emblow, C.; White, R. (Ed.). (2001). European register of marine species: a check-list of the marine species in Europe and a bibliography of guides to their identification. Collection Patrimoines Naturels, 50. Muséum national d'Histoire Naturelle: Paris, France. ISBN 2-85653-538-0. 463 pp. 

Solenogastres